Donald Martiny (born 1953 in Schenectady, New York) is an American artist. His abstract paintings are related to both action painting and Abstract expressionism.

Life 
Donald Martiny studied from 1977 to 1980 at the School of Visual Arts in New York City. From 1980 to 1983 he was a student at the Art Students League of New York.  At the same time he attended courses on art at the New York University. From 2007 to 2009 he continued his education at the Pennsylvania Academy of the Fine Arts. He lives and works in Ivoryton, Connecticut.

In 2015 Martiny received a scholarship as an Artist in Residence of the Sam & Adele Golden Foundation for the Arts in New Berlin, New York State and was represented in the annual exhibition of the artists there. Also in 2015, Martiny was invited to produce two large works for the One World Trade Center, which are permanently exhibited there. Martiny has lectured at Cornell University and at the Ackland Art Museum. There, in 2016, he conducted a public discussion on the painter Hans Hoffmann in the context of an exhibition of his works.

Work 
In an interview, Martiny has been called a gestural abstractionist. This term refers to a method of how the painter applies color to an object: "The idea was that the artist would physically act out his inner impulses, and that something of his emotion or state of mind would be read by the viewer in the resulting paint marks." (Tate Galleries) This technique is also known as Action painting.

Martiny describes his work as follows: "My paintings are actual authentic gestures. These brushstrokes are very much me and I want to be present in the works as honestly and authentically as I can be. They are a record of my physicality at a specific point in time."

Martiny does not paint on canvases or rectangular backgrounds. His works show the immediately frozen brushstroke, as Martiny designed it in his movements. He had to experiment for years with the composition of the paint, which should be liquid enough to reproduce the brush stroke well and at the same time be so durable in a dry state that the work can be mounted on the wall without breaking. The finished work is reinforced by an aluminium plate cut to the exact dimensions of the brush stroke as a base. The paintings then look like a relief on the wall.

The paint Martiny uses consists of a mixture of water-based polymers enriched with pigments. Sometimes he stretches this mixture with so-called microbubbles, which ensure that the paint looks light.

In contrast to the working method of other artists of Action painting, Martinys works are not only spontaneous. He first creates a sketch in miniature and, if he likes it, he produces the work in ever larger dimensions. He always works on the floor because this situation gives him the greatest freedom in his brushstrokes. He makes his own brushes, and sometimes he also takes his hands to express all his current emotions in the work. Martiny on his works: "Brushstrokes are dances trapped in paintings".

In November 2022, Donald Martiny designed the set for a dance performance by Amy Hall Garner of the Paul Taylor Dance Company at the David H. Koch Theater at the Lincoln Center for the Performing Arts, titled Somewhere in the Middle: "Donald Martiny’s set – hanging brushstroke pieces that show dimension through the thick, sometimes bumpy paint texture – changes in color and shape throughout the work, matching the liveliness of Mark Eric’s bright costumes (briefs and bras overlaid with transparent fabric).

Videography 
 2013: Video of the Biennale Non-Objective, Le Pont-de-Claix, France (2013): 10′ 14″
 2015: Video about the exhibition Donald Martiny: Freeing the Gesture,  Fort Wayne Museum of Art, United States (Mai 2014): 09′ 26″
 2015: Video about the exhibition State of the Art – Art of the State, Cameron Art Museum, United States (2015): 05′ 18″
 2016: Video on the works of Donald Martiny at the World Trade Center 02′ 32″
 2019: Video about the exhibition Donald Martiny: Fu in principio Materia Divina ("In the beginning there was Divine Material"), Casa del Mantegna, Mantua, Italy (2019): 02′ 54″
 2020: Video interview with Donald Martiny: Fu Materia Divina (Divine Material), Curated by Alain Chivilò: 07′ 53″ 
 2021: Video of the works of Donald Martiny in the group–exhibition Color Theory, Bentley-Gallery, Phoenix, Arizona, United States 01′ 20″

Audio 
 2015: A Chapel Hill Artist Paints His Way Into The World Trade Center

Works in collections (selection) 
 Art Collection of the One World Trade Center, New York City, United States
 Grahm Gund Family Foundation, Cambridge, Massachusetts, United States
 Patrick Duffy, Las Vegas Art Museum, Las Vegas, USA
 Stadt Le Pont-de-Claix, Frankreich
 Newcomb Art Museum, New Orleans, Louisiana, United States
 Crocker Art Museum, Sacramento, California, United States
 Amon Carter Museum, Fort Worth, Texas, United States
 Phoenix Art Museum, Phoenix

Solo exhibitions (selection) 
 2014: Donald Martiny: Freeing the Gesture, Fort Wayne Museum of Art, Fort Wayne, United States
 2016: Donald Martiny Paintings. Freeing the Gesture, Alden B Dow Museum of Art and Science, Midland, Michigan, United States
 2017: Donald Martiny: Pittura a Macchia, Madison Gallery, La Jolla, United States
 2017: Donald Martiny New Works: The River Series, Diehl Gallery, Jackson, United States
 2017: Donald Martiny, Artea Gallery, Milan, Italy
 2017: Overtones – Undercurrents, Horace Williams House, Chapel Hill, USA
 2018: Donald Martiny: Pinselstriche, Galerie Klaus Braun, Stuttgart, Germany
 2019: Donald Martiny: Divine Material,  Museum Casa del Mantegna, Mantua, Italy
 2019: Donald Martiny: Expanding the gestural Index, Pentimenti Galerie, Philadelphia, United States
 2019: Donald Martiny: Fu in principio Materia Divina (Donald Martiny: In the begin there was Divine Matter), Casa del Mantegna, Mantua, Italy
 2021: Donald Martiny: Jacopo Tintoretto: Pathways, Scala Contarini del Bovolo, Venice, Italy

Group exhibitions (selection) 
 2013: Fundaments, Galerie Concret, Paris, France 
 2013: Pourquoi pas – Why not. 2e Biennale internationale d’art non objectif, Le Pont de Claix, France
 2014: 25 Years Conny Dietzschold Galerie, Conny Dietzschold Galerie, Cologne, Germany 
 2014: 7 x Farbe pur. Monochrome Malerei, Galerie Klaus Braun, Stuttgart, Germany
 2014: China Art Projects, Conny Dietzschold Gallery, Sheung Wan, Hong Kong, China
 2015: State of the Art – Art of the State Cameron Art Museum, Wilmington, United States
 2015: Interact: Deconstructing Spectatorship: East Wing Biennial, The Courtauld Institute of Art, London, England 
 2015: Is it...Monochrome, Colorfield, or Object?, Gallery Sonja Roesch, Houston, United States 
 2015: Pino Pinelli, Donald Martiny, Bram Bogart, ArteA Gallery, Milan, Italy 
 2016: Made in Paint: Golden. Artworks of the 2015 artists in residence, Sam & Adele Golden Foundation for the Arts, New Berlin, United States
 2016: Plastische Malerei: Pino Pinelli, Donald Martiny und Matthias Lutzeyer, Klaus Braun Galerie, Stuttgart, Germany 
 2016: 60 Americans,  MakeShift Museum, Los Angeles, United States
 2016: It’s all about the hue, GreenHill Center for NC Art, Greensboro, United States 
 2016: All Things Great and Small, Falmouth Art Museum, Falmouth, Cornwall, Cornwall, England 
 2017: Remember when this wasn’t quite how I remembered it?, Pentimenti Gallery, Philadelphia, United States 
 2017: The Enduring Reasons Why: Celebrating 25, Pentimenti Gallery, Philadelphia, United States
 2017: Dialectical Praxis – Celia Johnson  & Donald Martiny, Fred Giampietro Gallery, New Haven, United States
 2017: State of the Art – Art of the State, Cameron Art Museum, Wilmington, United States
 2018: Roter Faden – Schwarz, Galerie Klaus Braun, Stuttgart, Germany
 2018/2019: Emergence, Dimmitt Contemporary Art, Houston, Texas
 2018/2019: Art Window: Donald Martiny, North Carolina Museum of Art, Raleigh, North Carolina, United States 
 2019: Simply Red, Gallery Sonja Roesch, Houston, Texas
 2020: 2020 Front Burner: Highlights in Contemporary North Carolina Painting, North Carolina Museum of Art, Raleigh, North Carolina, United States 
 2021: Color Theory, Bentley Gallery, Phoenix, United States
 2022: Personal Structures, Palazzo Bembo, Venice, Italy (In the framework of the program accompanying the Biennale)

 Art in public places 
 2015: Two works in the One World Trade Center: Lenape (named after the Indian Tribe Lenape which used to populate large parts of today's states New York and New Jersey) and Unami (named after the now extinct language of Lenapes).
 2019: Hugin + Munin'' (named as a reference to Huginn and Muninn in the Frost Tower Fort Worth, Fort Worth, Texas

Further reading

External links 
 Donald Martiny at artfacts.net
 Donald Martiny at kunstaspekte.de
 Webseite Donald Martiny

References

1953 births
Living people
American contemporary painters
Painters from New York City
People from Schenectady, New York
New York University alumni
Pennsylvania Academy of the Fine Arts alumni
School of Visual Arts alumni
Art Students League of New York alumni
People from Chapel Hill, North Carolina